Wakatsuki (若槻 or 若月) is a Japanese surname.

People with the name include:

, Japanese baseball player
Wakatsuki Reijirō (1866–1949), 25th and 28th Prime Minister of Japan
Jeanne Wakatsuki Houston, author of Farewell to Manzanar

Chinatsu Wakatsuki, singer

Japanese-language surnames